The Pro-Design Carrier is an Austrian two-place paraglider that was designed and produced by Pro-Design of Natters in the mid-2000s. It is now out of production.

Design and development
The aircraft was designed as a tandem glider for flight training and as such was referred to as the Pro-Design Carrier Bi, indicating "bi-place" or two seater.

The glider is DHV 1-2 certified.

Specifications (Carrier)

References

Carrier
Paragliders